The Morongo desert snail (Eremarionta morongoana) is a species of land snail in the family Helminthoglyptidae.

It is endemic to California in the Western United States.

It is known only from the Morongo Basin area of the Colorado Desert−Mojave Desert ecotone, in Riverside County and San Bernardino County.

References

External links

Eremarionta
Snail
Molluscs of the United States
Fauna of the Colorado Desert
Fauna of the Mojave Desert
Natural history of Riverside County, California
Natural history of San Bernardino County, California
Sand to Snow National Monument
Gastropods described in 1929
Taxonomy articles created by Polbot